The MLB Japan All-Star Series is an irregular end-of-the-season tour of Japan made by an All-Star team from Major League Baseball (MLB) since 1986, contested in a best-of format against the All-Stars from Nippon Professional Baseball (NPB) or recently as of 2014 their national team Samurai Japan (SJP).

The series has featured many great players, such as Nori Aoki, Barry Bonds, Ken Griffey Jr., Chase Utley, Ryan Howard, Hideki Matsui, Ichiro Suzuki, Shinnosuke Abe, David Ortiz, Sammy Sosa, Justin Morneau, David Wright, Jose Reyes, José Altuve, Robinson Canó and Manny Ramírez.

In the beginning of all games the American, Canadian and Japanese national anthems are all played. Games can end in a tie if it persists through 12 innings, just as in NPB rules.

List of series

MLB vs. NPB (1986–2006)

MLB vs. SJP (2014, 2018)
The Japan All-Star Series was resumed in 2014 after an eight-year break. Katsuhiko Kumazaki, then the new Commissioner of NPB, decided to field the national team Samurai Japan, instead of a NPB All-Star line-up, for the 2014 series. Kumazaki saw in this series a big opportunity for the Japanese team to gain hugely useful experience for the 2017 World Baseball Classic. Samurai Japan won the best-of-five series by a margin of three games to two. Particularly noteworthy was a combined no-hitter by Samurai Japan in Game 3 as their pitchers shut out the MLB All-Stars 4–0.

On May 1, 2018, MLB announced that it would send again an All-Star team to tour Japan after the end of current season, with six games scheduled against the Japan national team from November 9 to 15.

See also
List of Major League Baseball games played outside the United States and Canada
MLB Japan Opening Series 2008
MLB Taiwan All-Star Series
MLB China Series
2019 MLB London Series
List of National Football League games played outside the United States

References

External links

MLB-Japan Plays
NPB International Plays (in japanese)

 
Major League Baseball international baseball competitions
Major League Baseball competitions
Baseball competitions in Japan
Recurring sporting events established in 1986